Hone is both a surname and a given name or nickname. As a given name, it is common in New Zealand, where it is the Māori transliteration of the name John. 

Notable people with the name include:

Surname
Hone family
Brian William Hone (1907–1978), Australian headmaster 
Campbell Richard Hone (1873–1967), Anglican Bishop 
Daniel Hone (born 1989), English footballer 
David Hone (born 1946), Australian Rules footballer, cricketer and headmaster in Victoria
Evelyn Dennison Hone (1911–1979), British colonial administrator
Evie Hone (1894–1955) Irish painter and stained glass artist
Frank Sandland Hone (1871–1951), medical doctor in South Australia
Galyon Hone, stained glass artist working for Henry VIII of England
Garton Hone (1901–1991), South Australian cricketer and tennis player
Herbert Ralph Hone (1896–1992), British army officer, barrister and colonial administrator
Joseph Hone (1937–2016), British author 
Leland Hone (1853–1896), Irish cricketer
Margaret Hone (1892–1969), English astrologer 
Mark Hone (born 1968), English footballer 
Nathaniel Hone the Elder (1718–1784), Irish painter 
Nathaniel Hone the Younger (1831–1917), Irish painter 
Nathaniel Hone (cricketer, born 1861), Irish cricketer
Pat Hone (1886–1976), Irish cricketer
Philip Hone, (1780–1851), Mayor of New York from 1826 to 1827
William Hone (1780–1842), English writer, satirist and bookseller
William Hone (cricketer) (1842–1919), Irish cricketer

First name
Hone Harawira, New Zealand politician
Hone Heke (1810?–1850), Māori chief in New Zealand
Hone Heke Ngapua (1869–1909), Māori and Liberal Party Member of Parliament in New Zealand
Hone Tuwhare (1922–2008), New Zealand poet of Māori ancestry

Nickname
Edward Tyne, New Zealand rugby footballer

Māori given names